In volcanology, a lava dome is a circular mound-shaped protrusion resulting from the slow extrusion of viscous lava from a volcano. Dome-building eruptions are common, particularly in convergent plate boundary settings. Around 6% of eruptions on Earth are lava dome forming. The geochemistry of lava domes can vary from basalt (e.g. Semeru, 1946) to rhyolite (e.g. Chaiten, 2010) although the majority are of intermediate composition (such as Santiaguito, dacite-andesite, present day) The characteristic dome shape is attributed to high viscosity that prevents the lava from flowing very far. This high viscosity can be obtained in two ways: by high levels of silica in the magma, or by degassing of fluid magma. Since viscous basaltic and andesitic domes weather fast and easily break apart by further input of fluid lava, most of the preserved domes have high silica content and consist of rhyolite or dacite.

Existence of lava domes has been suggested for some domed structures on the Moon, Venus, and Mars, e.g. the Martian surface in the western part of Arcadia Planitia and within Terra Sirenum.

Dome dynamics

Lava domes evolve unpredictably, due to non-linear dynamics caused by crystallization and outgassing of the highly viscous lava in the dome's conduit. Domes undergo various processes such as growth, collapse, solidification and erosion.

Lava domes grow by endogenic dome growth or exogenic dome growth. The former implies the enlargement of a lava dome due to the influx of magma into the dome interior, and the latter refers to discrete lobes of lava emplaced upon the surface of the dome. It is the high viscosity of the lava that prevents it from flowing far from the vent from which it extrudes, creating a dome-like shape of sticky lava that then cools slowly in-situ. Spines and lava flows are common extrusive products of lava domes. Domes may reach heights of several hundred meters, and can grow slowly and steadily for months (e.g. Unzen volcano), years (e.g. Soufrière Hills volcano), or even centuries (e.g. Mount Merapi volcano). The sides of these structures are composed of unstable rock debris. Due to the intermittent buildup of gas pressure, erupting domes can often experience episodes of explosive eruption over time. If part of a lava dome collapses and exposes pressurized magma, pyroclastic flows can be produced. Other hazards associated with lava domes are the destruction of property from lava flows, forest fires, and lahars triggered from re-mobilization of loose ash and debris. Lava domes are one of the principal structural features of many stratovolcanoes worldwide. Lava domes are prone to unusually dangerous explosions since they can contain rhyolitic silica-rich lava.

Characteristics of lava dome eruptions include shallow, long-period and hybrid seismicity, which is attributed to excess fluid pressures in the contributing vent chamber. Other characteristics of lava domes include their hemispherical dome shape, cycles of dome growth over long periods, and sudden onsets of violent explosive activity. The average rate of dome growth may be used as a rough indicator of magma supply, but it shows no systematic relationship to the timing or characteristics of lava dome explosions.

Gravitational collapse of a lava dome can produce a block and ash flow.

Related landforms

Cryptodomes

One example of a cryptodome was in the May 1980 eruption of Mount St. Helens, where the explosive eruption began after a landslide caused the side of the volcano to fall, leading to explosive decompression of the subterranean cryptodome.

Lava spine/Lava spire

A lava spine or lava spire is a growth that can form on the top of a lava dome. A lava spine can increase the instability of the underlying lava dome. A recent example of a lava spine is the spine formed in 1997 at the Soufrière Hills Volcano on Montserrat.

Lava coulées

Coulées (or coulees) are lava domes that have experienced some flow away from their original position, thus resembling both lava domes and lava flows.

The world's largest known dacite flow is the Chao dacite dome complex, a huge coulée flow-dome between two volcanoes in northern Chile. There is another prominent coulée flow on the flank of Llullaillaco volcano, in Argentina, and other examples in the Andes.

Examples of lava domes

References

External links

 Global Volcanism Program: Lava Domes
 USGS Photo glossary of volcano terms: Lava dome

 
Volcanic landforms